Stade de Copet is a multi-use stadium in Vevey, Switzerland.  It holds approximately 4,000 spectators and is primarily used as a venue for football matches.

External links
 Vevey stadium - Stades

Copet
Vevey
Buildings and structures in the canton of Vaud